The Rivers State Ministry of Water Resources and Rural Development (RSMWRRD) is a government ministry of Rivers State, Nigeria entrusted with the management of water resources and promotion of socio-economic development of rural areas in the state. The ministry was formed in 1995 and has its current headquarters in the city of Port Harcourt. According to its website, the ministry's mission is "to develop and manage sustainable water for people in line with the MDG goal of 100L per day per person for food (agriculture and fisheries), and for industry in Rivers State."

Mandate
To formulate water resource policies and monitor the implementation of such policies in the state.

To source, analyse, store and disseminate information on the water resource data in the state.
   
To establish, monitor and oversee water parastatals of the ministry – the Rivers State Water Board and the Rural Water and Sanitation Agency.

To initiate and implement water supply projects in all areas of the state.

To liaise with the federal government and international donor agencies on water supply and development for the benefit of the state.

To set standards, regulate, supervise and control the use of all water resources in the state.

Implementing and provision of water legislation/ by-laws.

Collection and evaluation of hydrological and sociological data.

Departments
The Ministry of Water Resources and Rural Development is structured into the following departments:
 Rural Development
 Planning Research and Statistics
 Finance and Accounting
 Water Supply and Quality Control
 Hydrology and Hydrogeology
 Dams and Reservoirs
 Administration

List of commissioners
Ibibia Walter (2015–2017)
Kaniye Ebeku (2017-2019)
Tamunosisi Gogo Jaja (2020-2022)
Kaniye Ebeku (2022 - Date)

See also
 List of government ministries of Rivers State
 Port Harcourt Water Corporation PHWC

References

External links
 Official website

Water Resources
Water ministries
Ministries established in 1995
1995 establishments in Nigeria
1990s establishments in Rivers State
Environment of Rivers State
Rivers